Lord Collingwood was launched in 1806 at South Shields. She initially served as a transport. Then from 1816 on she started sailing to India under a license from the British East India Company (EIC). In 1828 her crew abandoned Lord Collingwood at sea.

Career
Lord Collingwood first appeared in the Register of Shipping (RS) in 1809.

In 1814 Lord Collingwood disappeared from RS, and had not yet entered Lloyd's Register (LR). She first appeared in LR in 1816.

In 1813 the EIC had lost its monopoly on the trade between India and Britain. British ships were then free to sail to India or the Indian Ocean under a licence from the EIC. Lord Collingwoods owners applied for such a licence on 1 March 1816 and received it on 12 March.

On 7 February 1816 Lord Collingwood, W. Coates, master, sailed for Bombay.

Lord Collingwood, Parkin, master, was coming out of Shields on 14 March 1818 on her way to London when she grounded. She was gotten off after she had discharged six or seven keels of coal. She was undamaged and proceeded on her voyage.

Fate
The US vessel Eliza Grant rescued the crew and took them to New York.

Citations

References
 
 

1806 ships
Age of Sail merchant ships of England
Maritime incidents in October 1828